Can't Beat the Feeling may refer to:

 "Can't beat the feeling!", a Coca-Cola slogan used in 1989
 "Coca-Cola - Can't Beat the Feeling", 2002 song by Tatana Sterba
 "Can't Beat the Feeling", song by Kylie Minogue from Aphrodite
 "Can't beat that feeling", a 2004 Banksy artwork, also known as Napalm